is a Japanese long jumper.

She won bronze medals at the 2000 World Junior Championships and the 2001 Summer Universiade, and finished eleventh at the 2001 World Championships. On the regional level she won a bronze medal at the 2005 Asian Championships and gold at the 2006 Asian Games.

Her personal best jump is 6.86 metres, achieved in May 2006 in Osaka. This is the current Japanese record.

She began competing as Kumiko Imura in the 2009 season.

Competition record

References

External links

1981 births
Living people
Sportspeople from Yamagata Prefecture
Japanese female long jumpers
Japanese female hurdlers
Olympic female long jumpers
Olympic athletes of Japan
Athletes (track and field) at the 2008 Summer Olympics
Asian Games gold medalists for Japan
Asian Games medalists in athletics (track and field)
Athletes (track and field) at the 2002 Asian Games
Athletes (track and field) at the 2006 Asian Games
Athletes (track and field) at the 2010 Asian Games
Medalists at the 2006 Asian Games
Universiade medalists in athletics (track and field)
Universiade bronze medalists for Japan
Medalists at the 2001 Summer Universiade
World Athletics Championships athletes for Japan
Japan Championships in Athletics winners
21st-century Japanese women